IVL Haukka were a series of Finnish biplane fighters designed by Kurt Berger at IVL in 1927. "Haukka" is Finnish for "Hawk".

Versions
IVL D.26 Haukka I - the first prototype aircraft, which made its maiden flight on March 17, 1927. Only one aircraft was manufactured.
VL D.27 Haukka II - a further developed version of the D.26. Two aircraft were manufactured at the aircraft factory at Suomenlinna (which now had shortened its name from IVL to VL). These aircraft were used by the Finnish Air Force in its Maalentoeskaadri for a couple of years. During this time the FAF had begun the purchasing of foreign fighters, which eventually halted the series production of the Haukka II.

Survivors
Two Haukkas are preserved, one D.26 at Päijät-Häme Aviation museum, and one D.27 at Hallinportti Aviation Museum.

Operators

Finnish Air Force

Specifications (D.26)

See also

References

Further reading
 Hallinportti Aviation museum: ''I.V.L. D.26 Haukka I ja D.27 Haukka II" brochure, summer 2005.

External links

1920s Finnish fighter aircraft
Biplanes
Single-engined tractor aircraft